Poilley refers to two communes in France:
Poilley, Ille-et-Vilaine
Poilley, Manche